Sara Beaumont Kennedy (1859 – March 12, 1920), born Sara Beaumont Cannon, was an American writer and newspaper editor.

Early life 
Cannon was born in Somerville, Tennessee, the daughter of Robert Hines Cannon and Nora Devereux Cannon. Her parents were both from North Carolina; her father was a doctor, and her mother was a teacher. One of her aunts was writer Mary Bayard Devereux Clarke. She counted among her ancestors Philip Livingston and William Samuel Johnson. She attended St. Mary's Hall in Raleigh, North Carolina.

Career 
Kennedy wrote in various genres, publishing poems, children's books, and historical fiction. She also wrote newspaper articles and short stories. She worked as an editor at the Memphis Commercial Appeal, a Tennessee newspaper. She was described as "the only woman paragrapher in the South". She lectured to women's organizations, and organized community groups. She was a member of the Daughters of the American Revolution. She favored prohibition and woman's suffrage.

Selected publications by Sara Beaumont Kennedy 

 "The Sign of the New Covenant" (1892)
 "The Master of Brookfield" (1896)
 The Assembly Ball (1897)
 Redcoat and Continental (1897)
 Doris: A Story of the Regulators (1898)
 A Christmas Message from Ocracoke: A Legend of Colonial Days (1900)
 "Colonial New Bern" (1901)
 The Wooing of Judith (1902)
 Joscelyn Cheshire: A Story of Revolutionary Days in the Carolinas (1902)
 "How Earl Hargis Went A-shopping" (1904)
 "When Tarleton Rode his Raid" (1904)
 "At the Old Horse Sale" (1905)
 Told in a Little Boy's Pocket (1908)
 Cicely; a Tale of the Georgia March (1911)
 One Wish, and other poems of love and life (1915)
 Poems (1919)

Personal life 
Cannon married fellow writer Walter Kennedy in 1888. Her husband died in 1909. She died in 1920. Nashville's Nineteenth Century Club held a "Friendship Day" in memory of Kennedy in December 1920. There is a collection of her papers in the collection of the Memphis Public Libraries.

References 

1859 births
1920 deaths
People from Somerville, Tennessee
St. Mary's School (North Carolina) alumni
American women poets
American women editors
Daughters of the American Revolution people
Historical fiction writers